Nettle Creek (also Nettlecreek) is an unincorporated community in Nettle Creek Township, Grundy County, Illinois, United States.

Notes

Unincorporated communities in Grundy County, Illinois
Unincorporated communities in Illinois